Venera 5 ( meaning Venus 5) was a space probe in the Soviet space program Venera for the exploration of Venus.

Venera 5 was launched towards Venus to obtain atmospheric data. The spacecraft was very similar to Venera 4 although it was of a stronger design. The launch was conducted using a Molniya-M rocket, flying from the Baikonur Cosmodrome.

When the atmosphere of Venus was approached, a capsule weighing  and containing scientific instruments was jettisoned from the main spacecraft. During satellite descent towards the surface of Venus, a parachute opened to slow the rate of descent. For 53 minutes on 16 May 1969, while the capsule was suspended from the parachute, data from the Venusian atmosphere were returned. The spacecraft also carried a medallion bearing the State Coat of Arms of the Soviet Union and a bas-relief of Lenin to the night side of Venus.

Given the results from Venera 4, the Venera 5 and Venera 6 landers contained new chemical analysis experiments tuned to provide more precise measurements of the atmosphere's components. Knowing the atmosphere was extremely dense, the parachutes were also made smaller so the capsule would reach its full crush depth before running out of power (as Venera 4 had done).

Instruments

Spaceship 
 Instrument KS-18-3M to study the flows of cosmic particles;
 Instrument LA-2U to determine the distribution of oxygen and hydrogen in the planet's atmosphere.

Lander 
 G-8 gas analyzers to determine the chemical composition of the atmosphere;
 TTI unit to determine the density of the atmosphere at an altitude; 
 FD-69 for atmospheric lighting measurements;
 CE-164D to determine the temperature at the height of the atmosphere.

Mission 
Venera 5 was launched into an Earth parking orbit on 5 January 1969 at 06:28:08 UT and then from a Tyazheliy Sputnik (69-001C) towards Venus. The probe entered the nightside atmosphere at 06:01 UT and when the velocity slowed to 210 m/s the parachute deployed and transmissions to Earth began.

The photometer detected a light level of 250 watts per square meter and confirmed the high temperatures, pressures, and carbon dioxide composition of the atmosphere found by Venera 4.

See also

 List of missions to Venus

References

External links

 Astronautix.com

Venera program
Derelict landers (spacecraft)
Spacecraft launched in 1969
1969 in the Soviet Union
2MV